Eric R. Dursteler (born 1964) is a professor of history at Brigham Young University (BYU) and chair of the BYU history department. He is a lecturer and seminar presenter, and has specialized in the history of early modern Italy, the history of the Mediterranean including the early modern Mediterranean, and the history of food. He has authored, edited or reviewed multiple published works, including scholarly books about medieval and early modern Mediterranean, Venetian history, has authored encyclopedic entries, numerous book chapters, and journal reviews.

Education and personal life 
Dursteler is a member of the Church of Jesus Christ of Latter-day Saints, and served as a church missionary in Italy.

Dursteler holds both a bachelor and MA degree from BYU, and an MA and PhD from Brown University. He completed his PhD in 2000.

He resides with his wife, Whitney Dursteler, in Provo, UT, and has three adult children.

Academic and professional career
Dursteler has been a faculty member of the BYU department of history since 1998, and served as chair of the BYU history department from 2016 to 2019. He has held a Fulbright Fellowship, a National Endowment for the Humanities fellowship and a Villa I Tatti fellowship from the Harvard University Center for Italian Renaissance Studies (2006-2007). In 2020 he was awarded a Fernand Braudel Senior Fellowship at the European University Institute.

He is the editor for News on the Rialto, "an annual publication devoted to providing an informational point of reference for scholars working on all aspects of Venetian studies, including the political, economic, social, religious, artistic, architectural, musical and literary history of the city, its overseas empire, and its mainland territories."  He was also formerly the book review editor for the Journal of Early Modern History, and serves on the International Editorial Advisory Board for the Journal of Mediterranean Studies. He is a member of the Founding Editorial Board for Oxford Bibliographies Renaissance and Reformation.

Selected works
Dursteler has authored numerous books, book chapters, encyclopedic entries, articles and reviews, some of which include:

Books
Dursteler, Eric R. (2006), Venetians in Constantinople: Nation, Identity and Coexistence in the Early Modern Mediterranean. Johns Hopkins University Press,   
Dursteler, Eric R. (2011), Renegade Women: Gender, Identity and Boundaries in the Early Modern Mediterranean. Johns Hopkins University Press,  
Dursteler, Eric R., editor (2013), A Companion to Venetian History, 1400-1797. Brill's Companions to European History, Volume 4, DOI: 10.1163/9789004252523
Dursteler, Eric R.; O'Connell, Monique (2016), "The Mediterranean World: From the Fall of Rome to the Rise of Napoleon". Johns Hopkins University Press, 
James A. Toronto, Eric R. Dursteler and Michael W. Homer (2017), Mormon in the Piazza: History of the Latter-day Saints in Italy. Provo and Salt Lake City: Brigham Young University Religious Studies Center in cooperation with Deseret Book. .
Dursteler, Eric R., editor and translator (2018), In the Sultan’s Realm: Two Venetian Ambassadorial Reports on the Early Modern Ottoman Empire. Toronto: Centre for Reformation and Renaissance Studies, 2018.

Book Chapters
"To Piety or Conversion More Prone? Gender and Conversion in the Early Modern Mediterranean"
"Fleeing "The Vomit of Infidelity": Borders, Conversion and Muslim Women's Agency in the Early Modern Mediterranean"

Awards 

 2022: Research Fellow, Netherlands Institute for Advanced Study, Netherlands
 2020: Fernand Braudel Senior Fellowship, European University Institute, Italy
 2006: Fellowship for Independent Study and Research, National Endowment for the Humanities, USA
 2006: Committee to Rescue Italian Art Fellowship, Villa I Tatti: The Harvard University Center for Italian Renaissance Studies, Italy
 1996: Fulbright Fellowship, Fulbright Commission, USA

References 

21st-century American historians
American male non-fiction writers
1964 births
Living people
Historians of Italy
Brigham Young University faculty
Brigham Young University alumni
Brown University alumni
Historians of the Mediterranean
Latter Day Saints from Utah
Mormon missionaries in Italy
Latter Day Saints from Rhode Island
21st-century American male writers